Gul Khan (born 5 March 1974) is an Indian producer, writer and director known for producing shows like Geet, Qubool Hai, Iss Pyaar Ko Kya Naam Doon?, Ishqbaaaz, Kullfi Kumarr Bajewala, Nazar, Yehh Jadu Hai Jinn Ka!, Imlie, Ishk Par Zor Nahi and  Aashiqana. She is co-creative head and co-producer of 4 Lions Films.

Early and personal life
Khan has studied in Jamia Millia Islamia, New Delhi. She is married to Gorky M.

Filmography

See also 
 List of accolades received by Ishqbaaaz

References

External links

Indian women television producers
Indian television producers
Indian women film producers
Film producers from Delhi
Living people
1973 births
Jamia Millia Islamia alumni
Businesswomen from Delhi